Provincial Highway 65 is an expressway, which begins in Wugu at Freeway 1 and ends in Tucheng at Freeway 3 and Provincial Highway 3. The total length is 12.469 km.

Exit list
The entire route is in New Taipei City.
{| class="plainrowheaders wikitable"
|-

!scope=col|Location
!scope=col|km
!scope=col|Mile
!scope=col|Exit
!scope=col|Name
!scope=col|Destinations
!scope=col|Notes
|-

See also
 Highway system in Taiwan

References

Highways in Taiwan